Playback is an album by organist Sam Lazar and his Trio, released on the Argo label in 1962.

Reception

Allmusic awarded the album 3 stars.  A Rovi review stated, "it's a solid organ-based album sure to please fans of the genre... An entertaining album worth the search".

Track listing 
All compositions by Sam Lazar except as indicated
 "Deep"
 "Long Gone" (Sonny Thompson)
 "Bags' Groove" (Milt Jackson) 
 "Fuzz Buzz" 
 "Just Make Love to Me" (Willie Dixon)
 "S.O.S."
 "Please Send Me Someone to Love" (Percy Mayfield)
 "Scootin'"

Personnel
Sam Lazar - organ
Miller Brisker - tenor saxophone
Joe Diorio - guitar
Phillip Wilson - drums
Technical
Ron Malo - engineer

References 

1962 albums
Sam Lazar albums
Soul jazz albums
Argo Records albums